Orzo is a rice-shaped pasta also known as .

Orzo may also refer to:
 , the Italian name for the cereal grain barley (Hordeum vulgare); sometimes encountered in English-language works on Italian cuisine
  ('coffee of barley'), a roasted grain beverage, often simply called "orzo" in Europe